The 2017–18 Elon Phoenix men's basketball team represented Elon University during the 2017–18 NCAA Division I men's basketball season. The Phoenix, led by ninth-year head coach Matt Matheny, played as fourth-year members of the Colonial Athletic Association in their final season playing their home games at Alumni Gym. They finished the season 14–18, 6–12 in CAA play to finish in a four-way tie for seventh place. They lost in the first round of the CAA tournament to Delaware.

This season marked Elon's final season playing at Alumni Gym, as they will open the new Schar Center for the 2018–19 school year.

Previous season
The Phoenix finished the 2016–17 season 18–14, 10–8 in CAA play to finish in a tie for fourth place. As the No. 5 seed in the CAA tournament, they lost in the quarterfinals to William & Mary.

Offseason

Departures

2017 recruiting class

Roster

Schedule and results

|-
!colspan=9 style=| Exhibition

|-
!colspan=9 style=| Non-conference regular season

|-
!colspan=9 style=| CAA regular season

|-
!colspan=9 style=| CAA tournament

See also
 2017–18 Elon Phoenix women's basketball team

References

Elon Phoenix men's basketball seasons
Elon